Mike Riddle (born June 17, 1986) is a Canadian freestyle skier. He won the gold medal in the halfpipe at the 2011 FIS Freestyle World Ski Championships. He also won silver at the Sochi 2014 Olympics.

References

External links
 
 
 
 
 

1986 births
Superpipe skiers
Living people
Canadian male freestyle skiers
Freestyle skiers at the 2014 Winter Olympics
Olympic freestyle skiers of Canada
Medalists at the 2014 Winter Olympics
Olympic silver medalists for Canada
Olympic medalists in freestyle skiing
Freestyle skiers at the 2018 Winter Olympics